Zadunayevsky is a rural locality (a khutor) in Zarevskoye Rural Settlement of Shovgenovsky District, the Republic of Adygea, Russia. The population was 38 as of 2018.

Geography 
Zadunayevsky is located 12 km southwest of Khakurinokhabl (the district's administrative centre) by road. Mikhaylov is the nearest rural locality.

References 

Rural localities in Shovgenovsky District